Atamanovka is a rural locality (a khutor) in Karpenkovskoye Rural Settlement, Kamensky District, Voronezh Oblast, Russia. The population was 50 as of 2010.

Geography 
Atamanovka is located 12 km southwest of Kamenka (the district's administrative centre) by road. Kamenka is the nearest rural locality.

References 

Rural localities in Kamensky District, Voronezh Oblast